"Sunshine Day" is the debut and only single by German duo Glaubitz & Roc. The song was released in 1999. A 2002 remix peaked at number 51 on the ARIA charts.

Track listings
 Main single (Peppermint Jam – PJMS0044)
 "Sunshine Day" (Extended Version)	- 6:47
 "Sunshine Day" (Dubmix) - 5:58
 "Sunshine Day" (Michi's Baggrabber Club Mix) - 7:13
 "Sunshine Day" (Michi's Lick-A-Lot Dub) -5:37

 Maxi single (2000) 
 "Sunshine Day" (Original Radio Edit) - 3:25
 "Sunshine Day" (Phats & Small Radio Edit) - 2:35
 "Sunshine Day" (Extended Version) - 6:48
 "Sunshine Day" (Michi's Baggrabber Club) - 7:13
 "Sunshine Day" (Phats & Small Mutant Disco Mix) - 6:15
 "Sunshine Day" (DJ Pippi's Sunshine In Benirras Mix) -5:54
 "Sunset" (Bossa Latin Jazz Mix By Glaubitz & Roc) - 5:56

 2002 Remixes (TINT CD5 076)
 "Sunshine Day" (Sgt Slick Radio Cut) - 3:48
 "Sunshine Day" (Elroy's Messyespanola Radio Edit) - 3:40
 "Sunshine Day" (Original Radio Version)	3:24
 "Sunshine Day" (Michi's Baggrabber Club Mix). 7:12
 "Sunshine Day" (Dub Mix)- 5:58
 "Sunshine Day" (Sgt Slick 2002 Mix) - 7:50
 "Sunshine Day" (Elroy's Messyespanola Mix) - 4:57

Charts

See also
 List of number-one club tracks of 2002 (Australia)

References

2002 singles
1999 singles
1999 songs
Warner Records singles